Holcosus bridgesii, also known commonly as Bridges's ameiva , is a species of lizard in the family Teiidae. The species is native to northwestern South America.

Etymology
The specific name, bridgesii, is in honor of American chemistry professor Robert Bridges (1806–1882).

Geographic range
H. bridgesii is found in southern Colombia (Nariño Department and Gorgona Island) and northwestern Ecuador (Carchi Province and Esmeraldas Province).

Habitat

Description

Reproduction
H. bridgesii is oviparous.

References

Further reading
Cope ED (1869) ("1868"). "Sixth Contribution to the Herpetology of South America". Proceedings of the Academy of Natural Sciences of Philadelphia [20]: 305–313. (Holcosus bridgesii, new species, pp. 306–307).
Harvey MB, Ugueto GN, Gutberlet RL (2012). "Review of Teiid Morphology with a Revised Taxonomy and Phylogeny of the Teiidae (Lepidosauria: Squamata)". Zootaxa 3459: 1–156.
Peters JA (1964). "The lizard genus Ameiva in Ecuador". Bulletin of the Southern California Academy of Sciences 63 (3): 113–127. (Ameiva bridgesii, pp. 117–122, Figures 1B & 2B).
Pinto-Erazo MA, Calderón-Espinosa ML, Medina-Rangel GF, Méndez-Galeano MA (2020). "Herpetofauna from two municipalities of southwestern Colombia". Biota Colombiana 21: 41–56.

bridgesii
Reptiles described in 1869
Taxa named by Edward Drinker Cope